Johann Nauwach (15951630) was the only significant German composer of solo songs before 1630.

Nauwach was born in Brandenburg, and was a pupil of Heinrich Schütz. Schütz dedicated a motet Glück zu dem Helikon (1627) to Nauwach's graduation.  Nauwach died in Dresden.

Works, editions and recordings
Libro primo di arie passegiate a una voce per cantar, e sonar nel chitarone, & altri simili istromenti Dresden, 1623
Erster Theil Teütscher Villanellen mit 1., 2. und 3. Stimmen auf die Tiorba, Laute, Clavicymbel, und andere Instrumenta gerichtet Freiberg: Georg Hoffmann, 1627

Recordings
Andreas Scholl Jetztund kömpt die Nacht herbey

References

1595 births
1630 deaths
17th-century classical composers
German classical composers
German Baroque composers
German male classical composers
Musicians from Brandenburg
Pupils of Heinrich Schütz
17th-century male musicians